Spermophagus is a genus of beetles belonging to the family Chrysomelidae subfamily Bruchinae.

Species

Spermophagus abdominalis Fabricius, 1781
Spermophagus aeneipennis Pic, 1917
Spermophagus albomaculatus Decelle, 1970
Spermophagus albosparsus Gyllenhal, 1833
Spermophagus albosuturalis Pic, 1933
Spermophagus albovittatus Anton, 2000
Spermophagus altaicus Karapetjan, 1973
Spermophagus babaulti Pic, 1921
Spermophagus bengalicus Borowiec, 1991
Spermophagus bifidus Anton, 2000
Spermophagus bimaculatus Pic, 1911
Spermophagus brincki Decelle, 1970
Spermophagus calystegiae (Lukyanovich & Ter-Minasyan, 1957)
Spermophagus canus Baudi, 1886
Spermophagus caricus Decelle, 1982
Spermophagus caucasicus Baudi, 1886
Spermophagus cederholmi Decelle, 1975
Spermophagus ceylonicus Pic, 1917
Spermophagus cicatricosus Gyllenhal, 1833
Spermophagus ciliatipes Pic, 1927
Spermophagus coimbatorensis Borowiec, 1991
Spermophagus complectus Sharp, 1866
Spermophagus confusus Borowiec, 1986
Spermophagus cornutus Delobel, 2008
Spermophagus coronatus Borowiec, 1991
Spermophagus decellei Borowiec, 1985
Spermophagus divergens Fahraeus, 1871
Spermophagus dongdokiensis Borowiec, 1991
Spermophagus drak Borowiec, 1991
Spermophagus eichleri Borowiec, 1986
Spermophagus endrodii Borowiec, 1986
Spermophagus excavatus Pic, 1917
Spermophagus heydeni Allard, 1868
Spermophagus hottentotus Fahraeus, 1839
Spermophagus humilis Decelle, 1970
Spermophagus incertus Borowiec, 1991
Spermophagus inlineolatus Pic, 1931
Spermophagus insularis Delobel, 2008
Spermophagus johnsoni Borowiec, 1985
Spermophagus kannegieterei Pic, 1911
Spermophagus kingsolveri Borowiec, 1986
Spermophagus klapperichi Borowiec, 1985
Spermophagus kochi Decelle, 1975
Spermophagus kuesteri Schilsky, 1905
Spermophagus kuskai Borowiec, 1986
Spermophagus latithorax Boheman, 1829
Spermophagus ligatus Chevrolat, 1877
Spermophagus lindbergorum Decelle, 1975
Spermophagus longepygus Anton, 1993
Spermophagus maafensis Borowiec, 1985
Spermophagus maai Borowiec, 1991
Spermophagus madecassus Pic, 1917
Spermophagus malvacearum Decelle, 1971
Spermophagus mannarensis Decelle, 1986
Spermophagus marmoreus Borowiec, 1991
Spermophagus maurus Fahraeus, 1871
Spermophagus maynei Pic, 1924
Spermophagus minutissiumus Borowiec, 1991
Spermophagus minutus Borowiec, 1991
Spermophagus moerens Boheman, 1839
Spermophagus monardi Decelle, 1975
Spermophagus multifloccosus Borowiec, 1991
Spermophagus multiguttatus Pic, 1917
Spermophagus multipunctatus Pic, 1917
Spermophagus murtulai Pic, 1924
Spermophagus negligens Pic, 1917
Spermophagus newtoni Borowiec, 1986
Spermophagus niger Motschulsky, 1866
Spermophagus okahandjensis Decelle, 1973
Spermophagus palmi Borowiec, 1991
Spermophagus perpastus (Lea, 1899)
Spermophagus pfaffenbergeri Borowiec, 1986 (Synonym of Spermophagus perpastus)
Spermophagus pilipes Borowiec, 1991
Spermophagus posticus Chevrolat, 1877
†Spermophagus pluto Wickham, 1914
Spermophagus pubiventris Baudi, 1886
Spermophagus punjabensis Borowiec, 1991
Spermophagus pygopubens Pic, 1930
Spermophagus ruandanus Borowiec, 1991
Spermophagus rufipes (Ter-Minassian, 1975)
Spermophagus rufanotatus Pic, 1903
Spermophagus samuelsoni Borowiec, 1991
Spermophagus schroederi Decelle, 1973
Spermophagus scotti Decelle, 1971
Spermophagus semiannulatus Pic, 1918
Spermophagus sericeus (Geoffroy, 1785)
Spermophagus shamszadehi Delobel & Sadeghi, 2013
Spermophagus siamensis Borowiec, 1991
Spermophagus sinensis Pic, 1918
Spermophagus somulicus Decelle, 1979
Spermophagus sophorae Fahraeus, 1839
Spermophagus stemmleri Decelle, 1977
Spermophagus takuensis Delobel, 2011
Spermophagus tandalensis Borowiec, 1986
Spermophagus titivilitius Boheman, 1833
Spermophagus transvaalensis Borowiec, 1986
Spermophagus tristis Fahraeus, 1871
Spermophagus truncatus Anton, 2000
Spermophagus variolosopunctatus Gyllenhal, 1833
Spermophagus vietnamensis Borowiec, 1991
†Spermophagus vivificatus Scudder, 1876
Spermophagus voarum Delobel, 2008
Spermophagus wittmeri Borowiec, 1985

References

Further reading

External links
 Biolib.cz
 Fossilworks

Bruchinae
Articles containing video clips
Taxa named by Carl Johan Schönherr
Chrysomelidae genera